Jaakko Jokinen (born 17 July 1993) is a Finnish ice hockey player who plays as a defenceman for JYP Jyväskylä.

References

Living people
JYP Jyväskylä players
Finnish ice hockey defencemen
People from Jämsä
1993 births
Sportspeople from Central Finland